Clearwater Water Park Development is a family entertainment company based in Ladera Ranch, California. The company ran Wild Rivers water park in Irvine, California. The company currently owns and operates Big Air Trampoline Parks, a franchised trampoline park based in Ladera Ranch, California

Parks 
Wild Rivers (1986–2011)
Splash Kingdom Waterpark (2012-2017)
Big Air Trampoline Parks USA (2013–present)

Purchase of Redlands Park 
In 2011, Clearwater purchased Splash Kingdom Waterpark in Redlands. The company changed the name to Splash Kingdom Waterpark and added several attractions. It is the largest water park in the Inland Empire. In 2017, Clearwater sold the park to PS80 Partners.

References 

Water parks in California